A list of films produced in Argentina in 1985:

1985

External links and references
 Argentine films of 1985 at the Internet Movie Database

1985
Argentine
Films